The St Helena cricket team represents the small and remote British island of St Helena in international cricket. It is organised by the St Helena Cricket Association which is a member of the Africa Cricket Association (ACA). The association joined the International Cricket Council (ICC) in 2001 as an affiliate member and became an associate member in 2017. The team made its international debut in 2012.

History
In April 2012, St Helena competed in its first international tournament, the ICC Africa Division 3 T20 Tournament. It was held in South Africa where St Helena beat Mali, Gambia, Cameroon and Morocco. They finished in fifth place out of eight teams. The team had to raise £24,000 to travel to South Africa, making a five-day sea trip aboard  as the island did not have an airport at the time.

In April 2018, they were drawn in the Southern sub-region group in the 2018 ICC World Twenty20 African Sub Regional Qualifier tournament. Later the same month, the ICC decided to grant full Twenty20 International (T20I) status to all its members. Therefore, all Twenty20 matches played between St Helena and other ICC members after 1 January 2019 would be a full T20I. St Helena won their first three matches in the Sub Regional Qualifier, recording victories against Eswatini, Malawi and Lesotho. They finished the tournament in third place but failed to reach the Regional Finals.

St Helena was drawn in Qualifier A in the African qualification for the 2024 T20 World Cup, facing seven teams in Rwanda in November 2022. The team and support staff were given free airfares on Airlink, the only airline flying to the island.

Records and statistics

International Match Summary — Saint Helena
 
Last updated 25 November 2022

Twenty20 International 
T20I record versus other nations

Records complete to T20I #1920. Last updated 25 November 2022.

Player records 
In Qualifier A of the African qualification for the 2024 T20 World Cup Andrew Yon set several T20I records, including becoming the 100th man to take five wickets in a T20I match.

See also 
 List of Saint Helena Twenty20 International cricketers

References

External links
 

Cricket in Saint Helena
National cricket teams
Cricket
Saint Helena in international cricket